Eduard Magnus Jakobson ( in Torma –  in Tallinn) was an Estonian wood engraver and a Baptist missionary. He illustrated many books and designed the masthead logo for Sakala, a newspaper founded by his older brother, Carl Robert Jakobson.

Originally a Lutheran, Eduard Magnus became a member of the Baptist church in 1869.

Gallery

References

External links
10 of his engravings

1847 births
1903 deaths
People from Jõgeva Parish
People from Kreis Dorpat
Estonian Baptist missionaries
19th-century Estonian male artists
Estonian illustrators
Wood engravers
Converts to Baptist denominations
Former Lutherans
19th-century Baptists